The women's middleweight 75 kg boxing event at the 2019 European Games in Minsk was held from 25 to 30 June at the Uruchie Sports Palace.

Results

References

External links
Draw Sheet

Women 75
2019 in women's boxing